The Swift Green Line is a bus rapid transit route in Snohomish County, Washington, United States, part of the Swift network operated by Community Transit. It was opened in 2019 and travels  along Airport Way and State Route 527, connecting 32 stations in the cities of Everett, Mill Creek, and Bothell. Its termini are at Seaway Transit Center, adjacent to the Boeing factory, and Canyon Park Park and Ride on Interstate 405; the Green Line also intersects the Blue Line in Everett and also serves Paine Field.

The Green Line was proposed in 2013 and began construction in July 2017. It cost $73 million to construct and opened on March 24, 2019.

History

Community Transit announced plans for a second Swift line in November 2013, tentatively named "Swift II", that would serve a  corridor between the Boeing Everett Factory and Mill Creek. The line was created out of two Transit Emphasis Corridors on Airport Road and State Route 527. A study was partially funded by the state legislature in 2012 and was prepared by Parsons Brinckerhoff, determining that the project would cost $42–48 million to construct and attract 3,300 riders when it opened.

The Federal Transit Administration approved project development in December 2014, a prerequisite to federal grants for capital construction and vehicle acquisition. During the 2015 session of the Washington State Legislature, Community Transit was granted the authority to increase sales taxes to fund operation of Swift II, pending voter approval via a ballot measure; the Washington State Department of Transportation also gave $6.8 million in funding to build the line's northern terminus at Seaway Transit Center. The ballot measure was approved by voters in November 2015, allowing for construction to begin sooner.

In August 2016, Community Transit announced that the Swift II project would be known as the "Green Line", while the first line would become the "Blue Line", and that the line would open in 2019. The $73 million cost of the Swift Green Line project was mostly covered by federal subsidies, including $43 million from a Federal Transit Administration "Small Starts" grant awarded in 2018. An additional $6.8 million grant from the Washington State Department of Transportation was used to build the line's northern terminus at Seaway Transit Center.

Construction on the Seaway Transit Center began in May 2017 and was scheduled to be finished by mid-2018. Construction on the rest of the stations and the 128th Street overpass began in November 2017. The queue jump and bus lane on the west side of the 128th Street interchange was opened in January 2018. Service began on March 24, 2019, a few weeks after the start of passenger flights to Paine Field.

Stations

The Green Line serves 34 stations, grouped into 18 pairs with two terminals, in the cities of Everett, Mill Creek, and Bothell. Each station has a raised platform for level boarding, ticket vending machines, ORCA card readers, and real-time arrivals information. The Blue Line intersects at the Highway 99 station, requiring a street crossing to complete the connection. The line also serves two park and ride lots at Mariner and McCollum Park.

Service

At its debut, the Green Line ran at a frequency of every 10 minutes on weekdays from 6 a.m. to 7 p.m., and 20 minutes on weekends and early mornings and nights on weekdays. The earliest trips departed at 4:20 a.m. on weekdays, 6 a.m. on Saturdays, and 7 a.m. on Sundays. The last trips ended at 11 p.m. on weekdays, 10 p.m. on Saturdays, and 8:40 p.m. on Sundays. It takes approximately 36 to 39 minutes for buses to travel the entire length of the Green Line.

Service on the Green Line was reduced to every 15 minutes on weekdays in March 2020 due to the COVID-19 pandemic. Fare collection was also suspended until June 1 to increase physical distancing between passengers, drivers, and fare ambassadors. Full service was restored in September 2020, but is planned to be reduced again to 12 minute weekday frequencies in March 2022 due to a lack of drivers.

References

External links

2019 in transport
Bus rapid transit in Washington (state)
Transportation in King County, Washington
Transportation in Snohomish County, Washington